Aldom Jean Deuro (born 20 December 2000) is a Malian professional footballer who plays for Belgian First Division A club Cercle Brugge.

Career
In January 2019, Cercle Brugge signed Deuro from Malian academy Afrique Football Elite. Due to issues with his paperwork, he did not arrive in Bruges until mid-April. On 3 August 2019, Deuro made his official debut for the club in a league match against Oostende, playing the full 90 minutes as Cercle lost 1–3.

In July 2021, Deuro joined French Championnat National club Châteauroux on a one-year loan deal. He made his debut on 6 August in a 2–0 win over Cholet as a 58th-minute substitute for Sofiane Daham.

References

Living people
2000 births
Association football midfielders
Malian footballers
Malian expatriate footballers
Cercle Brugge K.S.V. players
LB Châteauroux players
Belgian Pro League players
Championnat National players
Championnat National 3 players
Expatriate footballers in Belgium
Malian expatriate sportspeople in Belgium
Expatriate footballers in France
Malian expatriate sportspeople in France
21st-century Malian people